Denmark men's national goalball team is the men's national team of Denmark.  Goalball is a team sport designed specifically for athletes with a vision impairment.  The team takes part in international competitions.

Paralympic Games  
 

The 1976 Summer Paralympics were held in Toronto, Canada.  The team was one of seven teams participating, and they finished third overall. At the 1980 Summer Paralympics in Arnhem, Netherlands, twelve teams took part.  The team finished tenth. New York hosted the 1984 Summer Paralympics where thirteen teams participated and the team finished twelfth.

References

Goalball men's
National men's goalball teams
Denmark at the Paralympics
European national goalball teams